KESA or Kesa may refer to:

People with the name 
 Dan Kesa (born 1971), Serbian-Canadian ice hockey player
 Teemu Kesä (born 1981), Finnish ice hockey player
 Kesa Van Osch (born 1991), Canadian curler

Other uses 
 Kesa (clothing), Buddhist monk robes
 Kesa Electricals, a multinational electrical retailing company
 Kanpur Electricity Supply Company, electricity supply company in Kanpur, India
 KESA (FM), a radio station (100.9 FM) licensed to Eureka Springs, Arkansas, United States

See also 
 Kes (disambiguation)
 Kaisa (disambiguation)
 Kaesa Station, a station in Nakano, Japan